Derek McGrath (born June 4, 1951) is a Canadian actor and writer.

Life and career
McGrath was born in Timmins, Ontario. His career began as Linus in You're a Good Man, Charlie Brown. He is known for his roles in Cheers as Andy Schroeder (the would-be strangler of Diane Chambers), Oswald Valentine in Dallas, Dr. Benjamin Jeffcoate in My Secret Identity, Crewman Chell in Star Trek: Voyager, and as Dr. Derek Hebert in Doc. McGrath also played Buck the dog in a fantasy sequence in a second-season episode of Married... with Children, a game show host in a third-season episode of Family Matters, and a mutant in the 1993 comedy film Freaked. He appeared in a recurring role as the character of Anglican priest Duncan Magee in the CBC Television sitcom Little Mosque on the Prairie. He voices Spiff in the animated children's series Iggy Arbuckle. He also voices Melvin, the mayor of Maple Lake in the animated series Bob & Doug. He also provided the voice of Heathcliff's nemesis Spike in DIC's Heathcliff and the Catillac Cats. He has also voiced various characters in Grossology, Pole Position, The Romance of Betty Boop, Intergalactic Thanksgiving, Bakugan Battle Brawlers, Super Why!, Wayside, Ruby Gloom, Toot and Puddle, Spliced, Jane and the Dragon and Take Me Up to the Ball Game.

In the 1970s, he was a prominent actor on TVOntario educational programming, most notably Mathmakers.  In 2002, he narrated the National Film Board of Canada short The Hungry Squid, which won the Genie Award for Best Animated Short. 

He voices Mr. McFeely in Daniel Tiger's Neighborhood and Chief Quimby in Inspector Gadget. He also played Garth Harble, Animal Control Officer,  in the fifth season of The Red Green Show.

McGrath had a recurring role on Kim's Convenience as Frank the handyman.

Filmography

Film

Television

Video games

Awards and nominations
McGrath was nominated two years in a row (1989 and 1990) for a Gemini Award for My Secret Identity. The first time was for Best Performance by a Lead Actor in a Continuing Dramatic Role, and the second time was for Best Writing in a Dramatic Series (shared with Michael O'Connell, father of My Secret Identity lead Jerry).

References

External links

Derek McGrath page at Godspell.ca

1951 births
Living people
Canadian male film actors
Canadian male stage actors
Canadian male television actors
Canadian male voice actors
Male actors from Ontario
Writers from Timmins